List of films produced or distributed by the American company World Film Company active between 1914 and 1919. The company also released a number of imported foreign films for the American market. The company was merged into Selznick Pictures.

1914
 Uncle Tom's Cabin (1914)
 The Lure (1914)
 The Dollar Mark (1914)
 Mother (1914)
 The Chimes (1914)
 A Gentleman from Mississippi (1914)
 Man of the Hour (1914)
 Your Girl and Mine: A Woman Suffrage Play (1914)
 The Mystery of Edwin Drood (1914)
 When Broadway Was a Trail (1914)
 Across the Pacific (1914)
 The Wishing Ring (1914)
 One of Millions (1914)
 Lola (1914)
 The Dancer and the King (1914)
 The Seats of the Mighty (1914)
 The Marked Woman (1914)
 As Ye Sow (1914)
 The Pit (1914)
 In the Name of the Prince of Peace (1914)
 Mrs. Wiggs of the Cabbage Patch (1914)

1915
 The Deep Purple (1915)
 Mignon (1915)
 Wildfire (1915)
 The Daughter of the People (1915)
 Old Dutch (1915)
 Alias Jimmy Valentine (1915)
 Money (1915)
 The Fairy and the Waif (1915)
 M'Liss (1915)
 The Fight (1915)
 What Happened to Jones (1915)
 The Arrival of Perpetua (1915)
 The Man Who Found Himself (1915)
 Hearts in Exile (1915)
 The Lily of Poverty Flat (1915)
 The Model (1915)
 The Butterfly (1915)
 When It Strikes Home (1915)
 The Boss (1915) 
 The Builder of Bridges (1915)
 The Little Miss Brown (1915)
 Fine Feathers (1915)
 The Moonstone (1915)
 The Face in the Moonlight (1915)
 A Phyllis of the Sierras (1915)
 Colonel Carter of Cartersville (1915)
 After Dark (1915)
 The Cub (1915)
 Marrying Money (1915)
 Sunday (1915)
 The Stolen Voice (1915)
 The Little Dutch Girl (1915)
 The Master Hand (1915)
 The Cotton King (1915)
 The Impostor (1915)
 The Ivory Snuff Box (1915)
 Evidence (1915)
 Trilby (1915)
 The Flash of an Emerald (1915)
 The Little Mademoiselle (1915)
 The Master of the House (1915)
 The Price (1915)
 Blue Grass (1915)
 The Family Cupboard (1915)
 The Heart of the Blue Ridge (1915)
 The Bludgeon (1915)
 Salvation Nell (1915)
 Should a Wife Forgive? (1915)
 The Butterfly on the Wheel (1915)
 The Cowardly Way (1915)
 Hearts of Men (1915)
 Body and Soul (1915)
 A Daughter of the Sea (1915)
 The Sins of Society (1915)
 The Gray Mask (1915)
 The Warning (1915)
 The Siren's Song (1915)
 The Labyrinth (1915)
 Over Night (1915)
 Sealed Lips (1915)
 Camille (1915)
 The Senator (1915)
 The Rack (1915)
 The Ransom (1915)

1916
 Her Great Hour (1916)
 The Dragon (1916)
 McTeague (1916)
 Behind Closed Doors (1916)
 The City (1916)
 A Circus Romance (1916)
 The Ballet Girl (1916)
 The Clarion (1916)
 Fruits of Desire (1916)
 The Woman in 47 (1916)
 The Yellow Passport (1916)
 A Woman's Power (1916)
 Pawn of Fate (1916)
 The Price of Happiness (1916)
 As in a Looking Glass (1916)
 The Devil's Toy (1916)
 Passers By (1916)
 The Unpardonable Sin (1916)
 Man and His Angel (1916)
 The Supreme Sacrifice (1916)
 The Hand of Peril (1916)
 The Struggle (1916)
 The Reapers (1916)
 Then I'll Come Back to You (1916)
 Human Driftwood (1916)
 The Shadow of a Doubt (1916)
 Who Killed Simon Baird? (1916)
 The Social Highwayman (1916)
 The Closed Road (1916)
 The Chain Invisible (1916)
 The Feast of Life (1916)
 Bought and Paid For (1916)
 Her Maternal Right (1916)
 Sudden Riches (1916)
 The Twin Triangle (1916)
 Tangled Fates (1916)
 His Brother's Wife (1916)
 The Perils of Divorce (1916)
 La Bohème (1916)
 What Happened at 22 (1916)
 Fate's Boomerang (1916)
 The Crucial Test (1916)
 Paying the Price (1916)
 Sally in Our Alley (1916)
 The Weakness of Man (1916)
 Miss Petticoats (1916)
 A Woman's Way (1916)
 The Summer Girl (1916)
 The Rail Rider (1916)
 Husband and Wife (1916)
 The Almighty Dollar (1916)
 The Velvet Paw (1916)
 Friday the 13th (1916)
 The Dark Silence (1916)
 The Revolt (1916)
 The Gilded Cage (1916)
 The Hidden Scar (1916)
 The Scarlet Oath (1916)
 The Man Who Stood Still (1916)
 The Heart of a Hero (1916)
 The Faun (1916)
 Beyond the Wall (1916)
 The Men She Married (1916)
 All Man (1916)
 The New South (1916)
 The Rise of Susan (1916)
 The World Against Him (1916)

1917
 A Woman Alone (1917)
 On Dangerous Ground (1917)
 The Man Who Forgot (1917)
 The Bondage of Fear (1917)
 Tillie Wakes Up (1917)
 A Hungry Heart (1917)
 The Red Woman (1917)
 A Square Deal (1917)
 A Girl's Folly (1917)
 The Web of Desire (1917)
 The Dancer's Peril (1917)
 The Social Leper (1917)
 As Man Made Her (1917)
 Man's Woman (1917)
 The Family Honor (1917)
 Forget Me Not (1917)
 Darkest Russia (1917)
 The Page Mystery (1917)
 Moral Courage (1917)
 Yankee Pluck (1917)
 Maternity (1917)
 The Crimson Dove (1917)
 The False Friend  (1917)
 The Stolen Paradise (1917)
 The Divorce Game (1917)
 The Price of Pride (1917)
 The Brand of Satan (1917)
 Beloved Adventuress (1917)
 The Iron Ring (1917)
 Youth (1917)
 Souls Adrift (1917)
 The Little Duchess (1917)
 The Guardian (1917)
 The Tides of Fate (1917)
 Rasputin, the Black Monk (1917)
 Betsy Ross (1917)
 The Burglar (1917)
 The Corner Grocer (1917)
 A Maid of Belgium (1917)
 Shall We Forgive Her? (1917)
 The Dormant Power (1917) 
 Easy Money (1917)
 A Self-Made Widow (1917)
 Adventures of Carol (1917)
 Her Hour (1917)
 The Awakening (1917)
 The Good for Nothing (1917)
 The Tenth Case (1917)
 The Volunteer (1917)
 Diamonds and Pearls (1917)
 The Marriage Market (1917)
 The Strong Way (1917)
 The Woman Beneath (1917)

1918
 Stolen Hours (1918)
 The Beautiful Mrs. Reynolds (1918)
 The Gates of Gladness (1918)
 The Divine Sacrifice (1918)
 The Whims of Society (1918)
 Broken Ties (1918)
 His Royal Highness (1918)
 The Spurs of Sybil (1918)
 The Wasp (1918)
 Wanted: A Mother (1918)
 The Way Out (1918)
 The Cross Bearer (1918)
 The Witch Woman (1918)
 The Trap (1918)
 The Purple Lily (1918)
 Leap to Fame (1918)
 Journey's End (1918)
 Vengeance (1918) 
 The Oldest Law (1918)
 Stolen Orders (1918)
 The Interloper (1918)
 The Cabaret (1918)
 The Unchastened Woman (1918)
 The Man Hunt (1918)
 A Woman of Redemption (1918)
 The Heart of a Girl (1918)
 Tinsel (1918)
 The Golden Wall (1918)
 Joan of the Woods (1918)
 Neighbors (1918)
 Heredity (1918)
 The Beloved Blackmailer (1918)
 Merely Players (1918)
 Inside the Lines (1918)
 Eight Bells (1918)
 The Power and the Glory (1918)
 By Hook or Crook (1918)
 T'Other Dear Charmer (1918)
 To Him That Hath (1918)
 A Soul Without Windows (1918)
 Appearance of Evil (1918)
 The Road to France (1918)
 Just Sylvia (1918)
 The Grouch (1918)
 Hitting the Trail (1918)
 The Man of Bronze (1918)
 The Zero Hour (1918)
 The Love Net (1918)
 The Sea Waif (1918)
 Little Orphant Annie (1918)

1919
 What Love Forgives (1919)
 Love in a Hurry (1919)
 The Bluffer (1919)
 Heart of Gold (1919)
 The Rough Neck (1919)
 Mandarin's Gold (1919)
 Courage for Two (1919)
 The Moral Deadline (1919)
 The Crook of Dreams (1919)
 The Hand Invisible (1919)
 The Unveiling Hand (1919)
 Hit or Miss (1919)
 The Love Defender (1919)
 The Little Intruder (1919)
 The Scar (1919)
 The Quickening Flame (1919)
 Three Green Eyes (1919)
 Ginger (1919)
 The Unwritten Code (1919)
 The Social Pirate (1919)
 An Amateur Widow (1919)
 Phil for Short (1919)
 Through the Toils (1919)
 The Devil's Trail (1919)
 Love and the Woman (1919)
 Home Wanted (1919)
 The American Way (1919)
 Dust of Desire (1919)
 A Broadway Saint (1919)
 Bringing Up Betty (1919)
 Coax Me (1919)
 The Praise Agent (1919)
 The Clouded Name (1919)
 The Battler (1919) 
 His Father's Wife (1919)
 Forest Rivals (1919)
 Miss Crusoe (1919)
 The Oakdale Affair (1919)
 The Woman of Lies (1919)
 The Black Circle (1919)
 The Arizona Cat Claw (1919)
 When Bearcat Went Dry (1919)
 Me and Captain Kidd (1919)
 The Poison Pen (1919)
 The Steel King (1919)

References

Bibliography
 Koszarski, Richard . Fort Lee: The Film Town (1904-2004). Indiana University Press, 2005.
 Slide, Anthony. The New Historical Dictionary of the American Film Industry. Routledge, 2014.

World Film Company films
World Film
World Film